, also known as Sakai Tadayoshi,  was a Japanese daimyō of the Edo period, and he was a prominent shogunal official.  He was also known as by his courtesy titles of Shūri-daibu (1834; and again in 1850); as Wakasa-no-kami (1841); and Ukyō-daibu (1862). He was Obama's last daimyō, holding this position until the feudal domains were abolished in 1871.

Biography
Tadaaki was fifth son of Sakai Tadayuki, and became daimyō in 1834 on the retirement of Sakai Tadayori without an heir. His wife was a daughter of Matsudaira Terunobu of Takasaki Domain.  In 1840, he was given the courtesy title of Wakasa-no-kami and Lower 4th, Junior grade court rank. In 1842, was appointed a sōshaban and jisha-bugyō simultaneously. The following year was appointed the 48th Kyoto Shoshidai, and added the title of Jijū to his honorifics. Owing to his opposition of the candidacy of Tokugawa Yoshitomi (the later shōgun Iemochi) for the position of shōgun, he angered the political faction within the government which supported Hitotsubashi Yoshinobu. This was one of the causes of Ii Naosuke's Ansei Purge, and Tadaaki was forced to resign as Kyoto Shoshidai in 1850.

Tadaaki was reappointed as the 52nd Kyoto Shoshidai from August 5, 1858, through July 26, 1862. Many of the events which occurred in Kyoto during the tumultuous Bakumatsu period occurred while he was at Kyoto. During this period, he served as chief intermediary between the shogunate in Edo and Emperor Kōmei during a period of extensive negotiations, delays, and political maneuvering which accompanied plans for the eventual marriage of Komei's sister, Princess Kazunomiya, and Tokugawa Iemochi in March 1862.

He resigned again in 1862, this time also from the position of daimyō, adopting Sakai Tadauji, the son of a hatamoto as his heir, and went into retirement. At this time, he also changed his name to Tadatoshi (忠禄). However, with the start of the Boshin War, following the defeat of the Tokugawa shogunate forces at the Battle of Toba-Fushimi, he resumed the post of daimyō and defected to the Imperial side. In 1869, he was appointed imperial governor of Wakasa under the new Meiji government. He died in 1873.

Notes

References
 Appert, Georges and H. Kinoshita. (1888).  Ancien Japon. Tokyo: Imprimerie Kokubunsha.
 Beasley, William G. (1955). Select Documents on Japanese Foreign Policy, 1853–1868. London: Oxford University Press; reprinted by RoutledgeCurzon, London, 2001.   (cloth)
 Bolitho, Harold. (1974). Treasures Among Men: The Fudai Daimyo in Tokugawa Japan. New Haven: Yale University Press.  ;  OCLC 185685588
 Keene, Donald. (2002).  Emperor of Japan: Meiji and His World, 1852–1912.  New York: Columbia University Press.  
 Meyer, Eva-Maria. (1999).  Japans Kaiserhof in de Edo-Zeit: Unter besonderer Berücksichtigung der Jahre 1846 bis 1867. Münster: Tagenbuch. 
 Papinot, Jacques Edmond Joseph. (1906) Dictionnaire d'histoire et de géographie du japon. Tokyo: Librarie Sansaisha...Click link for digitized 1906 Nobiliaire du japon (2003)
 Plutschow, Herbert. (1995). [https://books.google.com/books?id=fNQjDQ-mWYgC&dq=sakai+tadayuki&lr=&source=gbs_summary_s&cad=0  "Japan's Name Culture: The Significance of Names in a Religious, Political and Social Context.] London: Routledge.  (cloth)
 Sasaki Suguru. (2002). Boshin sensō: haisha no Meiji ishin''. Tokyo: Chūōkōron-shinsha.

|-

|-

|-

Fudai daimyo
Sakai clan
Kyoto Shoshidai
1813 births
1873 deaths